The S5.92 is a Russian rocket engine, currently used on the Fregat upper stage.

Design
S5.92 burns a hypergolic mixture of UDMH and nitrogen tetroxide in the gas-generator cycle. It has two throttle settings. The highest produces  of thrust, a specific impulse of 327 seconds, and a 3-second ignition transient. The lower throttle level produces  of thrust, specific impulse of 316 seconds, and a 2.5 second ignition transient. It is rated for 50 ignitions, and 300 days between ignitions.

History
It was originally designed by the famous A.M. Isayev Chemical Engineering Design Bureau, for the two spacecraft of the Phobos program. While the Mars missions were unsuccessful, the spacecraft manufacturer, NPO Lavochkin, found a market niche for the technology. Thus, the engine was adapted for use on the optional Fregat upper stage of the Soyuz and Zenit launch vehicles.

See also
Fregat - The upper stage that is powered by the S5.92.
Soyuz - A medium lift rocket that uses the Fregat stage.
Zenit-3F - A heavy lift rocket that uses the Fregat stage.

References

External links
 KB KhIMMASH Official Page (in Russian)
 NPO Lavochkin Fregat Page (in Russian)

Rocket engines of Russia
Rocket engines of the Soviet Union
Rocket engines using hypergolic propellant
Rocket engines using the gas-generator cycle
KB KhimMash rocket engines